The Essentials: Alice Cooper is a compilation album featuring Alice Cooper, released in 2002 by Rhino Records as part of their The Essentials series.

Track listing

References

Alice Cooper compilation albums
2002 greatest hits albums